Mitogen-activated protein kinase kinase kinase kinase (MAP4K) is a family of proteins involved in cellular signal transduction.

 MAP4K1 (aka HPK1)
 MAP4K2 (aka GCK)
 MAP4K3 (aka GLK)
 MAP4K4 (aka HGK)
 MAP4K5 (aka KHS)
 MAP4K6 (aka MINK)

Images

See also
Signal transduction
MAP kinase
MAP kinase kinase
MAP kinase kinase kinase
List of unusual biological names

References 

Protein families